The Baylor Bears football statistical leaders are individual statistical leaders of the Baylor Bears football program in various categories, including passing, rushing, receiving, total offense, defensive stats, and kicking. Within those areas, the lists identify single-game, single-season, and career leaders. The Bears represent the Baylor University in the NCAA's Big 12 Conference.

Although Baylor began competing in intercollegiate football in 1898, the school's official record book considers the "modern era" to have begun in 1945. Records from before this year are often incomplete and inconsistent, and they are generally not included in these lists.

These lists are dominated by more recent players for several reasons:
 Since 1945, seasons have increased from 10 games to 11 and then 12 games in length.
 The NCAA didn't allow freshmen to play varsity football until 1972 (with the exception of the World War II years), allowing players to have four-year careers.
 Bowl games only began counting toward single-season and career statistics in 2002. The Bears have played in 9 bowl games since this decision, allowing players to accumulate statistics for an additional game in those seasons.
 Baylor as a team had never accumulated 5,000 yards of total offense during a single season before former head coach Art Briles arrived in 2008. However, since 2010, the Bears have averaged over 7,000 yards per season. Of the 27 offensive lists below, 25 of them include a Briles-era player in first place or a tie for first place.

These lists are updated through the end of the 2020 season.

Passing

Passing yards

Passing touchdowns

Rushing

Rushing yards

Rushing touchdowns

Receiving

Receptions

Receiving yards

Receiving touchdowns

Total offense
Total offense is the sum of passing and rushing statistics. It does not include receiving or returns.

Total offense yards

Touchdowns responsible for
"Touchdowns responsible for" is the NCAA's official term for combined passing and rushing touchdowns.

Defense

Interceptions

Tackles

Sacks

Kicking

Field goals made

Field goal percentage

References

Lists of college football statistical leaders by team
Statistical Leaders